"Dancing in the Street" is a song written by Marvin Gaye, William "Mickey" Stevenson and Ivy Jo Hunter. It first became popular in 1964 when recorded by Martha Reeves & The Vandellas whose version reached No. 2 on the Billboard Hot 100 chart and peaked at No. 4 in the UK Singles Chart. It is one of Motown's signature songs and is the group's premier signature song. A 1966 cover by the Mamas & the Papas was a minor hit on the Hot 100 reaching No. 73. In 1982, the rock group Van Halen took their cover of "Dancing in the Street" to No. 38 on the Hot 100 chart and No. 15 in Canada on the RPM chart. A 1985 duet cover by David Bowie and Mick Jagger charted at No. 1 in the UK and reached No. 7 in the US. The song has been covered by many other artists, including The Kinks, Tages, Black Oak Arkansas, Grateful Dead, Little Richard, Myra and Karen Carpenter.

Martha Reeves & The Vandellas original version

Background

The original version of "Dancing in the Street" by Martha Reeves & The Vandellas was produced in 1964 by William "Mickey" Stevenson and released as a single on the Gordy Records label. The song was written by Stevenson, Ivy Jo Hunter, and Marvin Gaye. The song highlighted the concept of having a good time in whatever city the listener lived. The idea for dancing came to Stevenson from watching people on the streets of Detroit cool off in the summer in water from opened fire hydrants. They appeared to be dancing in the water. The song was conceived by Stevenson who was showing a rough draft of the lyrics to Gaye disguised as a ballad. When Gaye read the original lyrics, however, he said the song sounded more danceable. With Gaye and Stevenson collaborating, the duo composed the single with Kim Weston in mind to record the song. Weston passed on the song and when Martha Reeves came to Motown's Hitsville USA studios, the duo presented the song to Reeves.

Reeves recounted that she initially regarded the song as too repetitive. Gaye and Stevenson agreed and including new Motown songwriter Ivy Jo Hunter added in musical composition. Martha Reeves remembered Marvin Gaye recorded the song first and sang it as though singing to a lover. Reeves, envisioning block parties and Mardi Gras, asked the producers to sing it her way. The song was recorded in two takes. The song's writers made sure to include Detroit as one of the cities mentioned with the lyric: "Can't forget the Motor City".

Civil rights anthem
The song took on a different meaning when riots in inner-city America led to many young black demonstrators citing the song as a civil rights anthem to social change which also led to some radio stations taking the song off its play list because certain black advocates such as H. Rap Brown began playing the song while organising demonstrations.
The anxiety elicited in parts of the dominant American society, by a dance "movement" inspiring a racial minority via this song, recalls the way in which the American government came to view the Ghost Dance religious movement among Native Americans in the 1890s.

"Dancing in the Street" had two meanings. The first is the one Martha Reeves asserted to reporters in England. "The British press aggravated Reeves when someone put a microphone in her face and asked her if she was a militant leader. The British journalist wanted to know if Reeves agreed, as many people had claimed, that "Dancing in the Street" was a call to riot. To Reeves, the query was patently absurd. 'My Lord, it was a party song,' she remarked in retrospect" (Smith 221). While Berry Gordy had created the Black Forum label to preserve black thought and creative writing, he kept the Motown record label and the popular hits it produced from being too political. "Berry Gordy Jr. was extremely wary about affiliating his business with any organization of movement that might negatively influence his company's commercial success" (Smith 230).

"Motown records had a distinct role to play in the city's black community, and that community—as diverse as it was—articulated and promoted its own social, cultural, and political agendas. These local agendas, which reflected the unique concerns of African Americans living in the urban north, both responded to and reconfigured the national civil rights campaign" (Smith 227). The movement lent the song its secondary meaning and the song with its second meaning fanned the flames of unrest. This song (and others like it) and its associated political meanings did not exist in a vacuum. It was a partner with its social environment and they both played upon each other creating meaning that could not have been brought on by one or the other alone. The song therefore became a call to reject peace for the chance that unified unrest could bring about the freedom that suppressed minorities all across the United States so craved.

Reception
"Dancing in the Street" peaked at No. 2 on the US Billboard Hot 100 chart when it was originally released as the group's third album Dance Party's first single in 1964 (see 1964 in music), with "There He Is (At My Door)" included as a B-side. "Dancing in the Street" also reached the Top 5 on the UK Singles Chart peaking at No. 4 in a 1969 release after initially peaking at No. 28 on the chart and helped to revive the Vandellas' success in the UK.  Cash Box described it as "an infectious romp that drops names of various locales as it declares that dancing is sweeping the country," stating that it is "one of those sure-fire sock-rock productions."

On April 12, 2006, it was announced that Martha and the Vandellas' version of "Dancing in the Street" would be one of 50 sound recordings preserved by the Library of Congress to the National Recording Registry. Lead singer Martha Reeves said she was thrilled about the song's perseverance, saying "It's a song that just makes you want to get up and dance".

In 2013, the original Motown recording was remixed for club and summer celebration airplay by Minneapolis' Billboard charting producer/remixer Joel Dickinson as well as Danny Shaffer.

Billboard named the song No. 29 on their list of 100 Greatest Girl Group Songs of All Time.

Personnel
 Lead vocals by Martha Reeves
 Background vocals by Betty Kelly, Rosalind Ashford, William "Mickey" Stevenson, and Ivy Jo Hunter
 Instrumentation by the Funk Brothers
Robert White: guitar
 Eddie Willis: guitar
 Joe Messina: guitar
 James Jamerson: bass guitar
 Marvin Gaye: drums
 Jack Ashford: percussion, tambourine, vibes 
 Ivy Jo Hunter: percussion (tire iron)
 Henry Cosby: tenor saxophone
 Thomas "Beans" Bowles: baritone saxophone
 Russ Conway: trumpet
 Herbert Williams: trumpet
 Paul Riser: trombone
 George Bohanon: trombone

Chart performance

Weekly charts

Year-end charts

Certifications

The Kinks version 

British rock band the Kinks recorded "Dancing in the Street" for their second studio album Kinda Kinks in 1965. It was one of only two cover songs on the album, and was recorded on February 15–17, 1965 at Pye Studios Number 2 in London, United Kingdom. The song was rush-recorded, along with most of Kinda Kinks in order to get a quicker release date. The album was released on March 5, 1965 and reached number 3 in the UK, and number 60 in the US.

Nonetheless, "Dancing in the Street" was panned by critics for being too boring. In his book Ready For a Brand New Beat: How 'Dancing In The Street' Became the Anthem for a Changing America, Mark Kurlansky states that the song contained no particular interpretation or a distinct rhythmic groove. Thomas M. Kitts states it as weak in his biography about Ray Davies, and Johnny Rogan calls it colorless in his book, Ray Davies: A Complicated Life. Ultimate Classic Rock considered the track a "barely awake cover of the Motown standard".

Personnel 
The Kinks

 Ray Davies – lead vocals, rhythm guitar
 Dave Davies – lead guitar, backing vocals
 Pete Quaife – bass guitar, backing vocals
 Mick Avory – drums

Other personnel

 Rasa Davies – backing vocals

The Mamas and the Papas version

Background
In 1966, the folk rock group, the Mamas & the Papas, recorded a cover version of the song "Dancing in the Street," which was taken from their second studio album The Mamas and the Papas. Cass Elliot sang the lead vocal, while the other members did their harmonies in the background. This version featured an instrumental section. The song's ending is humorous, which featured Elliot and Papa Denny Doherty having a dialogue listing the cities in both the United States, as well as Halifax, Nova Scotia, Canada, where Doherty was from, before the song's fade. At the Monterey Pop Festival in 1967, the Mamas and the Papas ended their set with "Dancing in the Street" before Elliot told the audience at the festival: "You're on your own.""cause we're sure on ours." This was the last time that the group performed live in concert.

"Dancing in the Street" was produced by Lou Adler and issued as the B-side of the single "Words of Love" on the Dunhill Records label. It reached No. 73 on the Billboard Hot 100 chart. Cash Box said it was a "a powerful reading of the Motown sound with Cass Elliot singing a powerful lead."

In 1969, Elliot covered the song on her television special, The Mama Cass Television Program.

Personnel 
The Mamas and the Papas

 Cass Elliot – lead vocals
 Denny Doherty – harmony and backing vocals
 Michelle Phillips – harmony and backing vocals
 John Phillips – guitar, harmony and backing vocals

Other Personnel

 Hal Blaine – drums, tambourine
 Joe Osborn – bass guitar
 Larry Knechtel – electric piano
 "Doctor" Eric Hord – guitar
 Lou Adler – producer

Charts

Tages version

Background 
Swedish rock group Tages incorporated "Dancing in the Street" into their setlist during either December 1965 or January 1966. This rendition was performed with original drummer Freddie Skantze, who did not sing lead vocals on the performances. Tages rendition of the song removes the brass parts for optimization during live performances, instead incorporating them into licks by lead guitarist Anders Töpel or organ parts played by rhythm guitarist Danne Larsson, who started learning the instrument in mid-1965. Following the success of their rendition of Marvin Gaye's "I'll Be Doggone", which reached number 10 on Kvällstoppen and number 7 on Tio i Topp in late May-early June 1966, Tages decided to record "Dancing in the Street" for their upcoming album Tages 2.

However, prior to recording the song, Skantze had left the band. He was swiftly replaced by Tommy Tausis, whose drumming talents and vocal skills fit the band perfectly. With Tausis now in the band, bassist Göran Lagerberg had started harmonizing with him on various songs, further minimizing Tommy Blom's role as lead singer in the band. The band had now also finalized the arrangement of "Dancing in the Street", with Lagerberg and Tausis sharing lead vocals on the track, with Larsson playing both the electric organ and piano to compensate for the lack of brass instruments. During sporadic sessions at Europafilm Studios, Bromma between May and June 1966, The group recorded "Dancing in the Street."

Release 
"Dancing in the Street" was first released by Platina Records on August 4, 1966 when it was included as the opening track on Tages 2, the group's second studio album. It was one of three rhythm and blues covers on the album, along with "I Got You (I Feel Good)" and "Leaving Here". The album sold over 10000 copies in Sweden alone, becoming their second and final album to be certified gold. The liner notes of the album states that "Dancing in the Street" is "the compact rhythmic opening with a new singing pair consisting of Göran Lagerberg and Tommy Tausis." The group would go on to record another album for Platina, Extra Extra before their contract expired, enabling them to sign with Parlophone Records instead. It was also at around this time that Tausis left the band to join the Spotnicks. He was replaced by Lasse Svensson.

After signing with Parlophone, Platina decided to issue several songs from Extra Extra as singles in order to capitalize on their success, starting with "Secret Room" in 1967. Following several singles from Extra Extra, Platina managed to extract "Dancing in the Street" for single release, almost one and a half years after it was recorded. It was the third single from Tages 2, following "In My Dreams" and "Crazy 'Bout My Baby", but was the only single from that album released in 1967. The b-side was "Those Rumours", a song which was written by the band and also appeared on Tages 2. Due to the lack of advertising regarding the single, and the release of the contemporary single "Treat Her Like A Lady", which reached number 7 on Kvällstoppen and 3 on Tio i Topp, "Dancing in the Street" failed to chart on Kvällstoppen, but entered Tio i Topp on December 9, 1967 for a week before being voted off.

The Swedish single sleeve is a photograph, which is an alternate take of the one which previously appeared on "Miss Mac Baren" in November 1966. Curiously, the Norwegian single sleeve shows Freddie Skantze, who did not participate in the recording. Tages performed the song on an episode of Swedish pop show Popsan on October 7, 1966.

Personnel 
Tages
 Göran Lagerberg – co-lead vocals, bass guitar
 Tommy Tausis – co-lead vocals, drums
 Tommy Blom – percussion, backing vocals
 Anders Töpel – lead guitar, backing vocals
 Danne Larsson – organ, piano, backing vocals
Other personnel
 Anders "Henkan" Henriksson – studio engineer
 Björn Almstedt – studio engineer

Charts

Grateful Dead version

The rock band Grateful Dead began performing "Dancing in the Street" live in 1966, and through 1971 played the song about 40 times, with Bob Weir singing lead before the song was shelved for several years. The song returned to their rotation in 1976, and was played about 80 more times before being retired in 1987. Live recordings from both periods have been released. In that second period, the group recorded a cover version of the song in the studio, and released it as a single taken from their 1977 album Terrapin Station. This version is credited to Stevenson, Gaye, and Hunter, but is titled "Dancin' in the Streets" rather than "Dancing in the Street".

Bassist Phil Lesh has described "Dancing in the Street" as the first song the band stretched out in the live setting from a short pop song into drawn out improvisational jam piece, a practice that would become a Grateful Dead signature.

Personnel 
Grateful Dead

 Bob Weir – co-lead vocals, rhythm guitar
Jerry Garcia – lead guitar
Donna Godchaux – co-lead vocals
 Keith Godchaux – keyboards, backing vocals
 Phil Lesh – bass guitar
 Mickey Hart – drums
Bill Kreutzmann-drums
Additional personnel
 The Martyn Ford Orchestra – brass instruments
 Rick Collins – mastering
 Greg Fulginiti – mastering
 Keith Olsen – production, engineering

Little Richard version 

Little Richard's version of the song was released in 1971, both on a single and on the album The King of Rock and Roll.

Van Halen version

Background

The American rock band Van Halen recorded a cover version of "Dancing in the Street" in 1982. This version features heavy use of the electric guitar, played by Eddie Van Halen. Speaking about the cover, group member David Lee Roth said: "It sounds like more than four people are playing, when in actuality there are almost zero overdubs—that's why it takes us such a short amount of time [to record]." Group member Eddie Van Halen, discussing the cover and discussing his synthesizer part in the track, said: "It takes almost as much time to make a cover song sound original as it does writing a song. I spent a lot of time arranging and playing synthesizer on 'Dancing in the Streets,' and they [critics] just wrote it off as, 'Oh, it's just like the original.' So forget the critics! These are good songs. Why shouldn't we redo them for the new generation of people?"

Reception
Van Halen released "Dancing in the Street" as the second single from their 1982 studio album Diver Down. Their version attracted decent commercial success, reaching the top 40 on the US Billboard Hot 100 chart and becoming a top 15 hit on the Canadian Singles Chart.

Track listing

7" single (Germany)
 "Dancing in the Street" – 3:43
 "Where Have All the Good Times Gone" – 3:02

7" single (U.S.)
 "Dancing in the Street" – 3:43
 "The Full Bug" – 3:18

Personnel
 David Lee Roth – lead vocals
 Eddie Van Halen – guitar, synthesizer, backing vocals
 Michael Anthony – bass, backing vocals
 Alex Van Halen – drums

Chart performance

David Bowie and Mick Jagger version

Background
A hit cover version of "Dancing in the Street" was recorded by the English rock icons Mick Jagger and David Bowie as a duo in 1985, to raise money for the Live Aid famine relief cause. The original plan was to perform a track together live, with Bowie performing at Wembley Stadium and Jagger at John F. Kennedy Stadium, until it was realized that the satellite link-up would cause a half-second delay that would make this impossible unless either Bowie or Jagger mimed their contribution, something neither artist was willing to do.

In June 1985, Bowie was recording his contributions to the Absolute Beginners soundtrack at Westside Studios with Clive Langer & Alan Winstanley, and so Jagger arranged to fly in to record the track there. A rough mix of the track was completed in just four hours on June 29, 1985.
Thirteen hours after the start of recording, the song and video were completed. Jagger arranged for some minor musical overdubs with Steve Thompson and Michael Barbiero in New York City.

The single version (Bob Clearmountain mix) is slightly different from the version used on David Bowie's Best of Bowie compilation and others, with the vocals and guitar brought out more and a slightly shorter intro.

Reception
The David Bowie and Mick Jagger recording of "Dancing in the Street" was issued as a single on EMI, with all profits going to the charity. The song topped the UK Singles Chart for four weeks, and reached No. 7 in the United States on the Billboard Hot 100 chart, making it the seventh and last top ten hit for Bowie and the only one for Jagger. Bowie and Jagger would perform the song once more, at the Prince's Trust Concert on June 20, 1986. The song has been featured since on several Bowie compilations and the Jagger compilation The Very Best of Mick Jagger. In 1988, U.S. television network ABC used a sample of this song, to promote their 1988–1989 campaign, but under the name "Something's Happening", which is the second year they used the same name, the first time being for the 1987–1988 campaign.

In 2011, it was voted the eighth-best collaboration of all time in a Rolling Stone readers poll. In a survey conducted by PRS for Music, the song was voted as the top song the British public would play at street parties in celebration of the 2011 Royal Wedding of Kate Middleton and Prince William.

"Dancing in the Street" was sixth best selling single of 1985 with 661,000 sold copies in United Kingdom.

Music video
The pair went to Spillers Millennium Mills in London to film a video with director David Mallet. The music video was shown twice at the Live Aid event. It was also shown in movie theaters before showings of Ruthless People, for which Jagger had recorded the theme song.

Track listings

7": EMI America / EA 204 United Kingdom
 "Dancing in the Street" (Clearmountain Mix) – 3:12
 "Dancing in the Street" (instrumental) – 3:17

12": EMI America / 12EA 204 United Kingdom
 "Dancing in the Street" (Steve Thompson and Michael Barbiero Mix) – 4:40
 "Dancing in the Street" (dub version) – 4:41
 "Dancing in the Street" (edit) – 3:24

Personnel
According to Chris O'Leary:
David Bowie, Mick Jagger – lead vocal
Kevin Armstrong, G. E. Smith, Earl Slick – guitar
Steve Nieve – keyboards 
Matthew Seligman, John Regan – bass
Neil Conti – drums
Pedro Ortiz, Jimmy Maelen – percussion
Mac Gollehon – trumpet
Stan Harrison – alto and tenor saxophone
Lenny Pickett – tenor and baritone saxophone
Helena Springs, Tessa Niles – backing vocals

Charts

Weekly charts

Year-end charts

Certifications

Myra version 

It was Myra's cover of "Dancing in the Street" for the 2001 Disney film Recess: School's Out that resulted in her becoming the first Latina Pop singer signed to Walt Disney Records. She would then re-record the song in Spanish, titled "Bailando en la Ciudad", in 2002 for the Disney Channel original movie, Gotta Kick It Up! This version was also included on the Spanish edition of her debut album, Milagros.

The English version of the cover song was accompanied by a music video directed by Scott Marshall and choreographed by Darrin Henson. The music video was shot against a black and white studio background in Los Angeles, California, with Myra and her background dancers dancing with a disc jockey playing music with records. Another version was made in which the video is interlaced with clips of the "Green Tambourine" closing sequence of the movie and Myra performing against a bluescreen displaying clips of the film; this version was featured at the end of the VHS release of the film.

Legacy
"Street Fighting Man", a 1968 song from the Rolling Stones, slightly modifies a signature line from "Dancing in the Street" to be: "Summer's here and the time is right for fighting in the street."

References

Further reading 
 

 Pegg, Nicholas (2000). The Complete David Bowie. Reynolds & Hearn Ltd. .
 Smith, Suzanne E. (2003). Dancing in the Street. Harvard University Press.

External links 
 List of cover versions of "Dancing in the Street" at SecondHandSongs.com
 Karen Carpenter (with the Dick Carpenter Trio) sings "Dancing in the Street on Your All American College Show (1968)

1964 singles
1964 songs
1979 singles
1982 singles
1985 singles
Arista Records singles
Atco Records singles
Atlantic Records singles
Charity singles
David Bowie songs
Dutch Top 40 number-one singles
EMI Records singles
European Hot 100 Singles number-one singles
Gordy Records singles
Grammy Hall of Fame Award recipients
Grateful Dead songs
KC and the Sunshine Band songs
Martha and the Vandellas songs
Mick Jagger songs
Music videos directed by David Mallet (director)
Number-one singles in Australia
RPM Top Singles number-one singles
Song recordings produced by William "Mickey" Stevenson
Songs about dancing
Songs about streets
Songs written by Ivy Jo Hunter
Songs written by Marvin Gaye
Songs written by William "Mickey" Stevenson
Teri DeSario songs
The Mamas and the Papas songs
The Walker Brothers songs
UK Singles Chart number-one singles
United States National Recording Registry recordings
Van Halen songs
Male vocal duets
Warner Records singles
Walt Disney Records singles
Avex Trax singles
Dunhill Records singles
Interscope Records singles
Platina Records singles